Van der Want is a Dutch surname. Notable people with the surname include:

Maarten van der Want (born 1995), Dutch footballer
Matthew van der Want (born 1972), South African singer-songwriter
Vincent van der Want (born 1985), Dutch rower

See also
Van der Walt

Dutch-language surnames